"When I Could Come Home to You" is a song co-written and recorded by American country music artist Steve Wariner.  It was released in October 1989 as the third single from the album I Got Dreams.  The song reached #5 on the Billboard Hot Country Singles chart.  Wariner wrote the song with Roger Murrah.

Chart performance

Year-end charts

References

1989 singles
Steve Wariner songs
Songs written by Roger Murrah
Songs written by Steve Wariner
Song recordings produced by Jimmy Bowen
MCA Records singles
1989 songs